The Australian Tertiary Admission Rank (ATAR) is the primary criterion for domestic student entry into undergraduate courses in Australian public universities. It was gradually introduced to most states and territories in 2009–10 and has since replaced the Universities Admission Index (in NSW and ACT), Equivalent National Tertiary Entrance Rank (in VIC), Tertiary Entrance Rank (in ACT, TAS, NT and SA) and the Overall Position (in QLD). It is a percentile ranking between 0.00 and 99.95 which shows student’s relative position compared to all other students in the age group of 16 to 20 years for that year. Though ATARs are calculated independently by each state, they are all considered equivalent. Since some students quit studying early or do not qualify for an ATAR in their state, the average ATAR amongst students who achieve one is 70.00. Admission to universities is granted based on the "selection rank" calculated by each university based on its own unique criteria. Selection ranks are a combination of ATAR and additional points based on universities' own criteria used for selecting students such as a "personal statement, a questionnaire, a portfolio of work, an audition, an interview or a test". Some universities also provide additional points on the basis of disadvantage such as for rural or Indigenous Australian applicants.  

The ATAR rank provides an indication of the overall position of the student in relation to the student body for that year across the state. A higher ATAR gives preference to that student for the course to which they wish to enrol in a university of their choice. The ATAR is used by all Australian public universities via their respective state-level admissions centres:

 Universities Admissions Centre (UAC) in New South Wales and the Australian Capital Territory,
 South Australian Tertiary Admissions Centre (SATAC) in South Australia and the Northern Territory,
 Victorian Tertiary Admissions Centre (VTAC) in Victoria,
 Tertiary Institutions Service Centre (TISC) in Western Australia,
 Queensland Tertiary Admissions Centre (QTAC) in Queensland,
 Office of Tasmanian Assessments, Standards and Certification (TASC) in Tasmania.

These bodies then allocate positions for the tertiary institutions in their relevant states. Tasmania is an exception, where the University of Tasmania is the only tertiary institution and therefore acts as a self-governing admissions centre. Private universities, with the exception of Bond University, do not primarily consider the ATAR and students must apply directly.

History

Introduction of ATAR
During June 2009, the Federal Minister for Education Julia Gillard announced the removal of Universities Admission Index (UAI) and the introduction of the Australian Tertiary Admission Rank, or ATAR, for Year 12 students of 2009 within the Australian Capital Territory and New South Wales, and for the rest of the country, excluding Queensland, in 2010. The ATAR was introduced to unify the university entrance system in Australia, where previously each state or territory had its own individual system (UAI in ACT/NSW, TER in SA/NT/WA/TAS, ENTER in Victoria). In 2020, Queensland switched to the ATAR as the primary tertiary entrance pathway, replacing the Overall Position (OP).

2016 ATAR error
In 2016, a computer error allowed 2075 students to receive their ATAR score five days earlier than they were supposed to be announced. External SMS provider for VCAA, Salmat Digital, created an error that allowed students to receive their results by texting VCAA and requesting their scores to be sent to them on the expected release date. This sparked outrage from parents of students who did not receive their scores, citing that they considered it "unfair", as well as concern about some students receiving their results before they were equipped to deal with them (particularly with regards to counselling).

Changes from UAI
The shift to ATAR means that the ranks most students receiving a UAI would increase by a small amount (although this would not present as any advantage as cutoffs would subsequently increase), while the maximum rank in NSW/ACT would change from a UAI of 100 to an ATAR of 99.95.

Calculating the ATAR

In all states, the ATAR is a percentile given between 0.00 and 99.95 which compares a student's performance in senior secondary with that of their peers. For example, an ATAR of 99.00 would indicate that the recipient performed better than 99% of their peers. "Peers" is not the body of students receiving an ATAR that year, but a notional body of persons who might have qualified to receive an ATAR – as a result, the median ATAR score is generally around 70.00. For example, the median ATAR score for 2014 was 68.95. Since 2020, all jurisdictions have used a one-parameter cubic spline model to convert their aggregate scores into percentiles. In most states, when a student achieves an ATAR between 0.00 and 30.00, their notification will only indicate an ATAR of "30 or less".

Though there are differences in how each state calculates the ATAR, they are all primarily based in the student's scaled subject results. Scaling is a process that is performed by all states which aligns student results along a common axis such that the same score in two subjects equates with the same level of achievement. In this way, students are not disadvantaged by taking difficult subjects where the average achievement is lower. Theoretically, this ensures that the ATARs between students is comparable even when they took a different combination of courses. Despite this, in a 2018 survey, 35.8% of HSC students said they chose one or more subjects because they believed it would help them achieve a higher ATAR.

Victoria
The Victorian ATAR (formerly ENTER) is calculated by the Victorian Tertiary Admissions Centre (VTAC) using student results provided by the Victorian Curriculum and Assessment Authority (VCAA). VTAC will combine the student's results into an "aggregate" which is a sum of selected (scaled) results from eligible subjects:

 the student's best score in one of English, English Language, Literature, or English as an Additional Language (EAL),
 the student's next three best scores; along with the English score these form the "primary four" results,
 10% of the next two best scores, known as "increments".

The Victorian aggregates are then mapped to percentiles for conversion to an ATAR. Students must pass an English subject in order to qualify for an ATAR as well as the Victorian Certificate of Education (VCE). The primary four results must be taken from VCE or Vocational Education and Training (VET) Units 3 and 4 sequences, while the increments can also include other results, such as interstate study or other lower-level VCE and VET results.

New South Wales 
The New South Wales ATAR is calculated by the University Admission Centre (UAC) using student results achieved in the Higher School Certificate (HSC). The marks included in the calculation can be accumulated over five years. Subjects are scaled such that "the scaled mean in a course is equal to the average academic achievement of the course candidature where, for individual students, the measure of academic achievement is taken as the average scaled mark in all courses completed". The aggregate is a sum of scaled marks in 10 units of eligible courses:

 2 units of English
 6 units from Category A subjects
 2 units from Category A or B subjects (if English Studies was used for the English marks, then these must be Category A units).

Students will achieve the highest possible aggregate given their results. The aggregates will be mapped to percentiles and given to students on their ATAR Advice Notice.

Australian Capital Territory 
The Australian Capital Territory (ACT) ATAR is calculated alongside the NSW equivalent by the University Admissions Centre (UAC). Results are calculated on the basis of students' achievement in the ACT Senior Secondary Certificate (ACT SSC). UAC treats all ACT and NSW students as one cohort and thus the two regions' ATARs are exactly equivalent. The aggregate score is calculated as a sum of the student's three best scores from major courses and 60% of the next best course.

Queensland
Queensland transitioned from the Overall Position (OP) to ATAR in 2019, with the 2020 cohort to be the first to graduate through the ATAR system. When the OP was still in place, the Queensland Tertiary Admissions Centre (QTAC) used a scaling method known as the "Queensland Core Skills Test". Since the introduction of the ATAR, Queensland now uses inter-scaling methods used by other states. ATAR can be calculated from a any of the following combination of results:

 5 general subjects at Units 3 and 4,
 4 general subjects and 1 applied subject, both at Units 3 and 4,
 4 general subjects at Units 3 and 4, and 1 Vocational Education and Training (VET) qualification (Certificate III or higher).

Like in New South Wales, students will be awarded on the basis of the combination ensuring the maximum final percentile. Students must pass an English subject in order to receive their Queensland Certificate of Education (QCE) and thus qualify for an ATAR, but their English result does not necessarily need to be included in the calculation of their ATAR.

Tasmania 
Since Tasmania has only one university, the University of Tasmania (UTAS), there is no state-wide admissions body. Students' results from the Office of Tasmanian Assessments, Standards and Certification (TASC) are provided directly to the university for calculation of scaling and ATARs. UTAS uses a polytomous Rasch model to scale course results. Students who qualify for the Tasmanian Certificate of Education (TCE) are automatically awarded an ATAR if they also pass four or more courses at the pre-tertiary level (Level 3 or 4). Unlike in other states and territories, students do not need to pass an English course to quality for a TCE or ATAR, though they must demonstrate an adult level of reading, writing and communication through another subject or through a safety net test. Most students who qualify for an ATAR will have completed an English course anyway, since pre-tertiary English is required for the majority of university entry.

The Tasmania ATAR is calculated from a Tertiary Entrance Score (TES), which is the sum of a student's scaled results in their five best pre-tertiary subjects. Three of these subjects must come from the student's final year of study (Year 12 or 13), and students may only count scores from two years of their study, even if they have taken a Year 13. Other subjects, such as selected University Connections Program (UCP) and High Achiever Program (HAP) units, may also contribute to a students ATAR. Since UCP and HAP units are only one semester long, only 8/15 of the scaled score may be counted towards the ATAR. The other 7/15 may come from any other subject but is generally chosen from the alternative semester UCP/HAP unit.

Western Australia 
The Tertiary Institutions Service Centre (TISC) is responsible for the calculation of students' ATARs in Western Australia. TISC does not require that students complete an English subject, though they must demonstrate literary competency through their Year 9 NAPLAN results or an Online Literacy and Numeracy Assessment (OLNA). TISC derives an ATAR percentile from a student's Tertiary Entrance Aggregate (TEA), which is calculated as a sum of the student's best four scaled subjects out of their Year 12 ATAR subjects over up to five consecutive years. Students may additionally count 10% of their score in any of the following subjects:

 any Language other than English (LOTE),
 Mathematics Methods,
 Mathematics Specialist.

The maximum TEA is 430. Mature age students may also receive a Mature Age Tertiary Entrance Aggregate, which only incorporates a student's best two subjects and well as 10% of any of the above subjects. The TEA is converted to an ATAR percentile using the cubic spline model.

See also

 Austudy Payment (for above 25 years old)
 Youth Allowance (for below 25 years old)
 List of universities in Australia
 Universities Admissions Centre (UAC) in NSW and ACT
 Victorian Tertiary Admissions Centre (VTAC) in VIC 
 South Australian Tertiary Admissions Centre (SATAC) in SA and NT
 Tertiary Institutions Service Centre (TISC) in WA
 Queensland Tertiary Admissions Centre (QTAC) in QLD
 Bored of Studies website calculator for approximate ATAR

References

Higher education in Australia
School qualifications